The Mosholu Jewish Center was an Orthodox synagogue located in the Norwood neighborhood of the Bronx in New York City at 3044 Hull Ave and was founded in 1927. From 1947 to its close in 1999 (due to the declining Jewish population of the Bronx), it was the pulpit of Rabbi Herschel Schacter

The  Neo-Renaissance synagogue building
currently houses the "Msgr. Boyle Head Start program", run by the Roman Catholic Archdiocese of New York

References 

Synagogues in the Bronx
Orthodox synagogues in New York City
Norwood, Bronx
1927 establishments in New York City
Former synagogues in New York (state)
Jewish organizations established in 1927
Renaissance Revival synagogues